Robert Percival Sweeting OBE is a Bahamian politician, and was an MP (Member of Parliament) in the Bahamas Parliament, representing the South Abaco Constituency, from 2002 until 2007. He did not run in the May 2007 general election.

He was named an Officer of the Order of the British Empire "for service to the community" in the 2002 New Year Honours lists.

References

Government of Bahamas – Members of Parliament - Robert Sweeting Retrieved May 11, 2007.
Government of Bahamas – General Election Results Official

Year of birth missing (living people)
Living people
Members of the House of Assembly of the Bahamas
People from South Abaco